PSG Public Schools is  a co-educational high school located on the Avanashi Road, Peelamedu, Coimbatore, India. The school was founded in 2002. The senior school was inaugurated in 2009. It educates students from Pre-KG through to the 12th Grade. PSG teaches to the Central Board of Secondary Education.

Organization
The school has a junior block which accommodates Pre-Kindergarten to grade 5 and the senior block which accommodates grades 6 to 12. The school's motto is aspire-aim-achieve.

The school has four houses:
 Cauvery - Blue
 Godhavari - Pink
 Krishna - Green
 Vaigai - Yellow.

References

External links
 

Primary schools in Tamil Nadu
High schools and secondary schools in Tamil Nadu
Schools in Coimbatore
Educational institutions established in 2002
2002 establishments in Tamil Nadu